Donkey milk (or ass milk, or jenny milk) is the milk from the domesticated donkey (Equus asinus).  It has been used since antiquity for cosmetic purposes as well as infant nutrition.

History 

Donkey milk has been used by humans for alimentary and cosmetic purposes since Egyptian antiquity; doctors recommended it to treat several afflictions, due to its healing and cosmetic virtues.

Hippocrates (460 – 370 BC), was the first to write of the medicinal use of donkey milk and prescribed it for numerous conditions including poisoning, fevers, infectious diseases, edema, healing wounds, nose bleeds, and liver trouble. In the Roman era donkey milk was  a recognized remedy; Pliny the Elder (23 – 79 AD) in his encyclopedic work, Naturalis Historia,  wrote extensively about its health benefits, i.e. to fight fever, fatigue, eye strain, weakened teeth, face wrinkles, poisonings, ulcerations, asthma and certain gynecological troubles,  but it wasn't until the Renaissance that the first real scientific consideration was given to donkey milk.  Georges-Louis Leclerc the Comte de Buffon (1707–1788) mentions the benefits of donkey milk in his Histoire naturelle and Pauline Bonaparte (1780–1825), Napoleon's sister, is reported to have used donkey milk for skin care. In France in the nineteenth century, Dr. Parrot of the Hospital des Enfants Assistés spread the practice of bringing motherless babies directly to the donkey's nipple (Bullettin de l’Académie de médicine, 1882). The donkey's milk was then sold until the twentieth century to feed orphaned infants and to cure delicate children, the sick and the elderly. For this reason, in Greece, Italy, Belgium, Germany, Switzerland many donkeys are born on farms. Nowadays donkey milk  is largely used in the manufacture of soaps and moisturizers, but new evidence show its possible medical use, especially to treat,  under the supervision of a doctor, infants and children with cow's milk  protein allergy (CMPA)  and with appropriate precautions such as a natural "formula" for infants.

Production 

The donkey is considered a seasonal polyestrous one, but the latitude in which the farm is located can greatly influence the reproduction cycle. The female is normally pregnant for about 12 months.

Donkey milk production differs greatly from that of conventional dairy species, especially in terms of milk supply which is much more limited. The equid mammary gland has a low capacity (max 2.5 L) and a part of the milk production should be left to the foal and milking may be carried out two or three hours after separation from the foal. Donkeys should be milked three times a day from 20 to 90 days after foaling. A female gives between 0.5 and 1.3 litres of milk a day for about 6–7 months.  The variability of donkey milk production is due to many factors, such as individual milkability, nutrition, genetics, management of reproduction, etc., in addition to milking management.

Generally, a donkey farm (breeding), aimed at milk production is small, with some tens of heads and rarely more. In Europe, and specifically in Emilia Romagna (Italy) there is only one very large donkey farm with 800 head.

Composition

Gross composition 
Published data on donkey milk gross composition confirm the closer resemblance to breast milk for lactose, protein and ash levels when compared with cow, sheep and goat milk. Despite the high lactose content of donkey milk the average fat content is lower for this purpose. When used in infant nutrition, donkey milk is usually supplemented with vegetable oil (4 mL 100 mL−1 milk) to conform to human milk energy.

The casein to whey protein ratio in donkey milk was lower compared to the value on cow milk.

The non-protein nitrogen (NPN) accounts for an average of 16% of total nitrogen in donkey milk, is much closer than values reported for human milk (20%) but higher than those of domestic ruminants (5%).

The amino acid profile of the donkey milk proteins shows a very similar percentage of essential amino acids (36.7 e 38.2 g amino acid /100 g protein) than in human milk proteins (40.7 g amino acid /100 g protein), according to Guo et al.

Functional and bioactive components 
Among the functional proteins detected in donkey milk, there are molecules active in antimicrobial protection such as lysozyme and lactoferrin. The lactoferrin content of donkey milk is intermediate between the lower values of cow milk and the higher values of human milk.  Lactoferrin inhibits the growth of iron-dependent bacteria in the gastrointestinal tract. This inhibits certain organisms, such as coliforms and yeast, that require iron. Lysozyme in donkey milk is present in large amounts, indeed ranges from 1.0 mg/mL to 4 mg/mL, depending on the analytical method used (chemical or microbiological);  this substance is present also in human (0.12 mg/mL) but only in trace amounts in cow and goat milk. Lysozyme in donkey milk is highly thermo-stable and is very resistant to acid and protease and may play a significant role in the intestinal immune response.

In donkey mammary secretion, defatted or not, growth factors and hormones have also been determined. In detail, donkey mammary secretions contain human-like leptin at levels close to human milk (3.35 e 5.32 ng/mL milk). The bioactive peptides insulin like growth factor 1, ghrelin and triiodothyronine were also found in frozen donkey milk. These molecules, and many others present in human milk, are increasingly receiving attention from a nutraceutical point of view because of their potential direct role in regulating food intake, metabolism, and infant body condition.

Nutritional use

Natural hypoallergenic milk for infants with cows’ milk protein allergy 
Pasteurized donkey milk is used as a natural hypoallergenic milk,  because it is tolerated by about 90% of infants with food allergies,  e.g., cows’ milk protein allergy (CMPA), a common food allergy in childhood with a prevalence of approximately 3% during the first 3 years of life.  However the infants tolerance of donkey milk must be evaluated first subjectively, under medical supervision and after carrying out specific allergy tests. As natural hypoallergenic formula it is preferred over those of soy or produced from protein hydrolysates because has a pleasant taste and does not cause allergies in some people who also have allergic reactions to soy proteins or protein hydrolysates

Natural  infants "formula" 

Donkey's milk is similar to human milk for its lactose, proteins, minerals, amino-acid content.

In terms of energy despite the high lactose content of donkey milk the average fat content is lower if used predominantly before weaning.

When used in infant nutrition before weaning, due to its low fat content to mimic breast milk, like all infant formulas,  donkey milk  should be integrated  with a source of fat   particular attention must also be given to essential fatty acids. Omega‐3 and omega‐6 fatty acids, particularly docosahexaenoic acid (DHA), are known to play an essential role in the development of the brain and retina. Intakes in pregnancy and early life affect growth and cognitive performance later in childhood,ensuring adequate intakes of fat, essential fatty acids and especially DHA through these life stages is crucial, cost effective dietary sources of these fatty acids  are needed to ensure adequate essential fatty acid and DHA intakes in these populations. The integration of these substances can take place with supplements of essential fatty acids (omega-3; omega-6) and vegetable oil certified for babies; this aspect is important to exclude the presence of spores that can pass the gastric mucosa in the first 4 months. For children who are not allergic to cow or goat milk, a part of fat can be compensated naturally by adding 1-2% of cow or goat butter. In any case, the integration of fats and essential fats can be done through the integration of donkey milk with artificial formulas for infants.

From the point of view of hygienic-sanitary safety,  like all milks, donkey milk and its ingredients must be pasteurized before taking; the process of pasteurizing donkey milk deactivates bacterial and viral contaminants.

Donkey milk contains immune-enhancing compounds (in particular lysozyme and lactoferrin) to help protect infants from disease.  In addition, the flavour and appearance of donkey milk have been found to be attractive to children.

Diet supplement 
Donkey’s milk is recommended for countering stomach acid, promoting the growth of intestinal flora, calming coughs and pertussis (a.k.a. whooping cough),  and for use in the treatment of immune-mediated disorders

Commercial forms

Raw donkey milk 
Donkey milk milked and cooled. According to European legislation, like all milks of animal origin, it must be pasteurized before being used. It can be kept for 3 days at refrigerator temperature. It is possible to freeze it for 2–3 months to extend its shelf life. In any case, it must be pasteurized and consumed before use

Pasteurized donkey milk 
Donkey milk is pasteurized in a closed circuit of pasteurization and bottling (aseptic) at at least 72 °C for 15 seconds or equivalent times and temperatures. In case of pasteurization in discontinuous systems, the temperature must be higher depending on the method used and the type of plant and destination

Freeze drying (lyophilized) 
Donkey milk can be freeze dried to preserve the biological quality of the milk, and so preserve its nutritional, functional and cosmetic properties. This is possible because in freeze drying the milk is frozen and brought under vacuum at low temperatures. During this process the water is removed by sublimation. The result is approximately ten percent of dry matter that is called lyophilized (or freeze dried) donkey milk. This powder is easy to reconstitute.  The lyophilized product has to be packaged without any oxygen. It has a shelf life of two years. Normally it is produced from pasteurized donkey milk so it is ready to use

Concluding, the treatment of lyophilization (freeze dried) of donkey's milk demonstrated that the natural colour, flavours, nutrients, bioactive substances of the fresh donkey milk are retained. Instead, with the spray-drying method, another way to dry products, the milk is being heated whereby vitamins and other important bioactive substances will get lost. In addition Freeze-dried don't require chemical preservatives and can be either consumed directly or re hydrated easily. However, this method for its high costs is practiced only by a few companies.

This product it is easy to find in Italy and Europa , where it was for the first time put on the market.

Fermented donkey milk (kumis) 
The use of fermented equid milk is an ancient tradition in central Asia, like kumis or airag, a fermented mares milk very popular in Asia and Russia; but there are also traditional variants made from donkey milk.

In Mongolia, where kumis is the national drink, people have a saying that ‘kumys cures 40 diseases’.

Cosmetic use

Cosmetics with donkey milk 
In recent years, the cosmetic industry is mainly focused towards products made with natural ingredients and it is oriented to a sustainable consumption. Because of their natural origin, milk components correspond in many fields to the needs of cosmetology.

Recent scientific study on a cream containing of lyophilized donkey milk showed different benefits for the skin. These results are related to the effectiveness of donkey milk components like proteins, minerals, vitamins, essential fatty acids, bioactive enzyme and coenzyme which allow the skin a balanced nourishment and a proper hydration. In particular vitamin C content in donkey milk is almost 4 times more of cow's milk. Donkey milk contain more lactoferrin of cow milk and a considerable mounts of lysozyme, from 1.0 mg/mL to 4 mg/mL (depending on the analytical method used: chemical or microbiological), instead cow's milk only traces. For this reason, it has the potentiality, when properly formulated,  to reduce problem skin with eczema, acne, psoriasis and herpes and properties in calming the irritation symptoms as reported by some authors.

Some authors have preliminarily evaluated whether the use of a face cream made from donkey milk affected the perception of some sensory aspects. The results showed that treated cream resulted appreciated by dry skin consumers for the following sensory aspects: spreadability, total appearance, smoothness, moisturisation and total effectiveness . The overall judgement also resulted highest for face cream made with donkey milk.

Today, donkey milk is still used in the manufacture of soaps and creams.

History 
It is said that Cleopatra, Queen of Ancient Egypt, took baths in donkey milk to preserve the beauty and youth of her skin. Legend has it that no less than 700 donkeys were needed to provide the quantity of milk necessary for her daily bath.

This was also the case of Poppaea Sabina (30–65), second wife of Roman Emperor Nero, who is referred to in Pliny’s description of the ass milk virtues for the skin:

"It is generally believed that ass milk effaces wrinkles in the face, renders the skin more delicate, and preserves its whiteness : and it is a well-known fact, that some women are in the habit of washing their face with it seven times daily, strictly observing that number. Poppaea, the wife of the Emperor Nero, was the first to practise this; indeed, she had sitting-baths, prepared solely with ass milk, for which purpose whole troops of she- asses used to attend her on her journeys "

The Roman poet Ovid (43 BC. – 18 AD.) also in his poem Medicamina Faciei Femineae, suggest beauty masks made with donkey milk.

Pauline Bonaparte (1780–1825), Napoleon's sister, is also reported to have used ass milk for her skin's health care.

References 

Donkey Milk The girl who succeeded in a strange business

Milk by animal
Donkeys